This is a list of airports in Poland, sorted by location, IATA and ICAO airport codes, passenger traffic and runway surface.

Airports with commercial passenger service

Source:

Defunct passenger airports
Airports that served commercial passenger traffic in the past.

Airports with paved runways

Airports with unpaved runways

Highway strips

Locations

References

 

 
Airports
Poland
Poland